Antanas Vienuolis (born Antanas Žukauskas; 7 April 1882 — 17 August 1957) was a Soviet and Lithuanian writer, dramatist and one of the most famous realistic prosaists.

Biography 

Vienuolis was born on April 7, 1882, in Ažuožeriai, Anykščiai District Municipality, Russian Empire. His parents, Julijonas Žukauskas and Rozalija Baranauskaitė, were peasants. Antanas was the youngest child and the only one son in the family, he had 5 older sisters. Antanas' family was in quite good circumstances and had 25 ha of land.

In 1894, he moved to Užupiečiai, where he attended Anykščiai school, where all subjects were taught in Russian. Žukauskas was an exemplary student at school. In 1895 he moved to Liepāja, where he attended the Liepāja Gymnasium and met famous Lithuanian writer Jonas Biliūnas.

Vienuolis died on August 17, 1957, from acute thrombosis of the coronary arteries. He was buried in the yard near his house.

Works 

Vienuolis has written many legends, novels, novellas, memorials and dramas.

List of works of Antanas Vienuolis:

 Amžinasis smuikininkas (Eternal violinist)
 Užkeiktieji vienuoliai (Cursed monks)
 Platelių ežero paslaptis (Secret of Lake Plateliai)
 Gražuolės Lalos kalnas(Mountain of Beauty Lala)
 Kruvinojo keršto uola (Rock of the bloody revenge)
 Samgori dykuma (Samagori desert)
 Krymo įspūdžiai (Crimean impressions)
 Mieganti Ararato mergelė (Sleeping miss from Ararath)
 Anykščių padavimai (Anykščiai stories)
 Medvėgalio pilis (Medvėgalis Castle)
 Naglio kalno lobiai (Treasure of Mount Naglis)
 Šventavartė (Holygate)
 Grįžo (Came back)
 Aleliuja (Hallelujah)
 „Kūčių naktį (At night of Christmas Eve)
 Paskutinė vietelė (The last place)
 „Užžėlusiu taku
 Paskenduolė (The drowned)
 Didysis karas (The big war)
 Pati
 Samdinė Elena
 Mano krikštatėvio kumeliukas (My Godfather's colt)
 Pavainikė (Illegitimate)
 Arkliavagio duktė (Rustler's daughter)
 Gediminaitė ir mužikas (Gediminaitė and kern)
 Susitikimai Kaukaze (Meetings in Caucasus)
 Iš mano atsiminimų (From my memorials)
 Inteligentų palata (Intelligents' ward)
 Vėžys
 Mirtinai sužeistas (Mortally wounded)
 Karžygys (Warrior)
 Prieš dieną (Day before )
 Kryžkelės (Crossroads)
 1831 metai (The year 1831)
 Nemigo naktys (Sleepless nights)
 Viešnia iš šiaurės (Guest from the north)
 Ministeris (Minister)
 Dauboje (In the dip)
 Išdukterė
 Puodžiūnkiemis

1882 births
1957 deaths
Recipients of the Order of Lenin
Recipients of the Order of the Red Banner of Labour

Lithuanian male writers
Lithuanian revolutionaries
Soviet writers